Supriyo Bandyopadhyay is an Indian-born American electrical engineer, academic and researcher. He is Commonwealth Professor of Electrical and Computer Engineering at Virginia Commonwealth University, where he directs the Quantum Device Laboratory.

Bandyopadhyay has authored over 400 research publications on a wide range of topics including spintronics, straintronics, nanoelectronics and related aspects of nanotechnology. He is also the author of three textbooks entitled Physics of Nanostructured Solid State Devices, Introduction to Spintronics, and Problem Solving in Quantum Mechanics: From Basics to Real World Applications for Materials Scientists, Applied Physicists and Device Engineers.

Bandyopadhyay is a Fellow of the Institute of Physics (UK), the Institute of Electrical and Electronics Engineers (IEEE), The Electrochemical Society, the American Physical Society, and the American Association for the Advancement of Science.

Education
Bandyopadhyay received his B.Tech. degree in Electronics and Electrical Communications Engineering from Indian Institute of Technology, Kharagpur in 1980. He then earned his M.S. degree in Electrical Engineering from Southern Illinois University in 1982, and a Ph.D. degree in Electrical Engineering from Purdue University in 1985.

Career
Following his Doctoral degree, Bandyopadhyay held a brief appointment as a Visiting Assistant Professor of Electrical Engineering at Purdue University before joining the University of Notre Dame in 1987 as an Assistant Professor of Electrical Engineering. From 1990 till 1996, he served as an Associate Professor there. He subsequently joined the University of Nebraska-Lincoln as a Professor of Electrical Engineering in 1996. In 2001, he joined Virginia Commonwealth University and held a primary appointment as Professor of Electrical Engineering in the Department of Electrical and Computer Engineering and courtesy appointment as a Professor of Physics in the Department of Physics. Since 2011, he has been serving as Commonwealth Professor Virginia Commonwealth University.

Bandyopadhyay served as a Jefferson Science Fellow for the US National Academies of Science, Engineering and Medicine during 2020–2021, and was a Senior Adviser to the USAID Bureau of Europe and Eurasia in the Division of Energy and Infrastructure at Washington, DC. He is also the founding Chair of the Institute of Electrical and Electronics Engineers (IEEE) Technical Committee on Spintronics (Nanotechnology Council), and past-chair of the Technical Committee on Compound Semiconductor Devices and Circuits (Electron Device Society). He was an IEEE Electron Device Society Distinguished Lecturer from 2005 to 2012, and was an IEEE Nanotechnology Council Distinguished Lecturer in 2016 and 2017. He is a past Vice President of the IEEE Nanotechnology Council in charge of conferences and is currently serving as a Vice President of the same organization in charge of publications. He served in the IEEE Fellow Committee from 2016 until 2018.

Research
Bandyopadhyay has worked extensively on spintronics, straintronics, nanoelectronics, nanosynthesis, electrochemical self-assembly, quantum dots and nanowires, hot carrier and quantum transport of charge in solids, spin based quantum computing and classical logic circuits, spin transport in nanostructures, and spin-based devices and general topics in spintronics.

Nanotechnology
Bandyopadhyay developed several electrochemical techniques to produce well-ordered regimented arrays of nanostructures. He has demonstrated new functionalities in nanoscale devices.

Spintronics and straintronics 
Bandyopadhyay's most recent work has involved switching nanomagnets with electrically generated strain to produce energy-efficient digital information processing hardware. He is a pioneer in the field of hybrid spintronics and straintronics, His group harnessed straintronics to demonstrate an extreme sub-wavelength electromagnetic antenna that overcame the theoretical limits on antenna gain and efficiency and exceeded them by several orders of magnitude. He and his collaborators also conducted a study in 2021 to demonstrate resonant amplification of spin waves in a periodic two-dimensional interacting array of multiferroic nanomagnets which would have applications in magnonic devices.

Awards and honors
1998 & 1999 - Elected Man of the Year, the American Biographical Institute
2000 - Faculty Service Award, University of Nebraska-College of Engineering
2001 - Interdisciplinary Research Award, University of Nebraska
2002–2012 - Distinguished Lecturer, IEEE Electron Devices Society
2004 - Fellow, Institute of Physics (UK)
2005 - Fellow, Institute of Electrical and Electronics Engineers (IEEE)
2005 - Fellow, The Electrochemical Society
2005 - Fellow, American Physical Society
2006 - Fellow, American Association for the Advancement of Science
2012 - Distinguished Scholarship Award, Virginia Commonwealth University
2015 - Lifetime Achievement Award, Department of Electrical and Computer Engineering, Virginia Commonwealth University
2016 - Distinguished Alumnus Award (Gold Medal), Indian Institute of Technology, Kharagpur, India 
2016 - Virginia's Outstanding Scientist, named by Governor Terence R. McAuliffe of Virginia
2016–2017 - Distinguished Lecturer, IEEE Nanotechnology Council
2017 - Award of Excellence, Virginia Commonwealth University
2017 - Global Initiative of Academic Networks (GIAN) Lectureship, Govt. of India
2018 - Visiting Advanced Joint Research (VAJRA) Fellowship, Dept. of Science and Technology, Govt. of India
2018 - Outstanding Faculty Award, State Council of Higher Education for Virginia 
2020 - Albert Nelson Marquis Lifetime Achievement Award 
2020 - IEEE Pioneer Award in Nanotechnology For pioneering contributions to spintronics and straintronics employing nanostructures 
2022–2024 - Distinguished Lecturer, Sigma Xi

Bibliography

Books
Physics of Nanostructured Solid State Devices (2012) ISBN 9781461411406
Introduction to Spintronics, Second edition (2015) ISBN 9781482255577
Problem Solving in Quantum Mechanics: From Basics to Real World Applications for Materials Scientists, Applied Physicists and Device Engineers (2017) ISBN 9781118988756

Selected articles
Datta, S., Melloch, M. R., Bandyopadhyay, S., Noren, R., Vaziri, M., Miller, M., & Reifenberger, R. (1985). Novel interference effects between parallel quantum wells. Physical review letters, 55(21), 2344.
Zeng, H., Zheng, M., Skomski, R., Sellmyer, D. J., Liu, Y., Menon, L., & Bandyopadhyay, S. (2000). Magnetic properties of self-assembled Co nanowires of varying length and diameter. Journal of Applied Physics, 87(9), 4718–4720.
Zeng, H., Skomski, R., Menon, L., Liu, Y., Bandyopadhyay, S., & Sellmyer, D. J. (2002). Structure and magnetic properties of ferromagnetic nanowires in self-assembled arrays. Physical Review B, 65(13), 134426.
Pramanik, S., Stefanita, C. G., Patibandla, S., Bandyopadhyay, S., Garre, K., Harth, N., & Cahay, M. (2007). Observation of extremely long spin relaxation times in an organic nanowire spin valve. Nature nanotechnology, 2(4), 216–219.
Roy, K., Bandyopadhyay, S., & Atulasimha, J. (2011). Hybrid spintronics and straintronics: A magnetic technology for ultra low energy computing and signal processing. Applied Physics Letters, 99(6), 063108.

References 

Living people
Indian American
Virginia Commonwealth University faculty
IIT Kanpur alumni
Southern Illinois University alumni
Year of birth missing (living people)
Fellows of the American Physical Society